"The River Is Wide" was a song written by Billy Admire and Gary Knight and was originally recorded by the Forum in 1967.

Background

The Forum
The record was first released in 1966 on the Penthouse label. It did not go anywhere and after being re-mastered and re-edited, it was released a second time in May 1967, this time on the Mira label. Nothing happened the second time. Then Decca got hold of the master. The record then started to make some progress in the UK, which got the attention of a DJ in Seattle.  He started playing it and it started attracting attention in Seattle. By July 1967, the record was at no. 88 in the Billboard charts. It finally got to no. 45.

Bobby Rydell
By May 1968, Bobby Rydell had a version of the single out on the Reprise label. It was produced by Dave Hassinger. The B side, "Absence Makes The Heart Grow Fonder", was arranged by Artie Butler.

The Grass Roots

It became a hit for American rock band the Grass Roots. In April 1969, their version of "The River Is Wide" entered the Billboard Hot 100 chart at no. 87, and by May, it had reached its peak position at no. 31.  The song appeared on their studio album Lovin' Things, which was released the same year. It later appeared on the band's compilation albums More Golden Grass and Their 16 Greatest Hits, which were released in 1970 and 1971 respectively. The song has also been included on multiple subsequent compilations by the group. The single version does not contain the thunder present at the beginning of the LP version, and is also in a different key.

Releases

United States

References

1966 songs
1967 singles
1969 singles
The Grass Roots songs
Song recordings with Wall of Sound arrangements